The Meyrifab are a small semi-nomad tribe of Africans of Semitic stock, settled on the east bank of the Nile near Berber.

References

Ja'alin tribe